Éva Darlan (née Osty, born 3 September 1948) is a French actress, director, producer and writer.

Career
At the age of 14, she attended acting classes at the Cours Simon and starts at 16 years as an amateur. She took theater studies at the École nationale supérieure des arts et techniques du théâtre, located Rue Blanche and then immediately starts a theatrical career.

In 1978, she had been nominated for the César Award for Best Supporting Actress, for A Simple Story in which she played the role of Anna.

Writer

Filmography

Theatre

Notes and references

External links

 
 Interview (in French)

1948 births
20th-century French actresses
21st-century French actresses
Actresses from Paris
Audiobook narrators
French film actresses
French feminists
French stage actresses
French television actresses
French women film directors
French women film producers
French women writers
Officiers of the Ordre des Arts et des Lettres
Living people